Summer is a Walt Disney short film released on January 6, 1930. Directed by Ub Iwerks, it is the sequel to the short Springtime (1929). It is 6 minutes long.

Summary 
The short film begins with several caterpillars dancing towards some flowers. The caterpillars enter the flowers, and then emerge from the flowers as butterflies. They fly and pollinate every flower they pass over. Butterflies fly on a branch but disturb a stick with legs. The stick threatens them with its teeth. Then the stick dances and falls into a river. A dragonfly flies over the river, accompanying two ladybirds. Two dung beetles play with a ball of excrement on the ground. They lose the ball of excrement, which crashes into a tree trunk and explodes. When it explodes, its pieces turn into little flying insects, which dance. So do four flies on a flower. The flies then carry a spider's web with them and play leapfrog with the spider, but the spider eats the flies. The spider dances on the spider's web. However, the spider's web was tied to a tree and the tree falls on it. This is how the film ends.

Reception
Motion Picture News (February 1, 1930): "Simply Grand. And still they come! This young man, named Walt Disney, is helping to supply an entire nation with a constant load of laughs. The Silly Symphony series in Summer adds another to a long list of delightful bits of cartoon humor. The animation by Ub Iwerks is clever in the extreme. He gets the most ludicrous of situations from his characters which, with the additional nicely timed and properly selected music, make this one reeler exactly what it is."

Variety (February 26, 1930): "Good anywhere. A Disney creation in the Silly Symphony series. One objection is that it resembles too keenly a previous release by the same maker called Springtime. In both creations weather breezes are denoted through leaping and contortionist insects, plants, and in a similar manner. Withal, however, it has its snickers. Seizing upon caterpillars and butterflies to express the freedom of musical summer carries its own laughs, which in essence is the spirit of the present cartoon. Carl Stalling's musical arrangement is light, airy and rhythmic."

Home media
The short was released on December 19, 2006, on Walt Disney Treasures: More Silly Symphonies, Volume Two.

References

External links

1930 short films
American black-and-white films
1930s Disney animated short films
Silly Symphonies
Films directed by Ub Iwerks
Films produced by Walt Disney
1930 animated films
1930 films
Columbia Pictures short films
Columbia Pictures animated short films
Animated films without speech
American animated short films
Films scored by Carl Stalling
Animated films about insects
1930s English-language films
1930s American films